Diplomatic relations between Argentina and New Zealand, have existed for decades. Both nations are mutual members of the Cairns Group and the United Nations.

History 

Argentina and New Zealand are two industrialized southern hemisphere nations. Diplomatic relations between both nations were established in 1964. Relations, however, between the two nations were very limited, in part because of the distance between them. It wasn't until 1977 that Argentina opened an embassy in Wellington.

In 1976, Argentina came under a military dictatorship which became increasingly hostile and asserted its claims over the Falklands Islands (which are British Overseas Territories in the South Atlantic Ocean). In April 1982, Argentina invaded the Falklands Islands, triggering what was to be known as the Falklands War. Immediately after the invasion of the Islands by Argentine troops, New Zealand severed diplomatic relations with the Argentine government and imposed economic sanctions. The war ended with a British victory in June 1982. In 1984, Argentina and New Zealand re-established diplomatic relations. In 1987, Argentina opened a consulate in Auckland and re-opened its embassy in Wellington in 1997. In April 1998, Argentina's President, Carlos Menem, paid a visit to New Zealand and met with New Zealand Prime Minister Jenny Shipley. That same year, New Zealand re-opened its embassy in Buenos Aires. 

Since the re-establishment of relations, both counties have worked together to improve global agricultural trade, preserve Antarctica and the Southern Ocean, and lobby the international community for awareness of climate change, whale conservation, international human rights, peace-keeping and non-proliferation of weapons. In November 2001, New Zealand's Prime Minister, Helen Clark, paid a visit to Argentina. Both countries have established a working holiday visa scheme. In December 2015, Air New Zealand began direct flights between Auckland and Buenos Aires. In 2017, Argentina's Secretary of Agriculture, Ricardo Negri, visited New Zealand.

High-level visits

High-level visits from Argentina to New Zealand
 President Carlos Menem (1998)
 Secretary of Agriculture Ricardo Negri (2017)

High-level visits from New Zealand to Argentina
 Prime Minister Helen Clark (2001)
 Foreign Minister Murray McCully (2010)

Trade
In 2016, total trade between Argentina and New Zealand totaled US$199 million. Argentina's main exports to New Zealand include: soya bean oil cake, sugar, prepared and preserved fruits and nuts, and vehicles. New Zealand's main exports to Argentina include: paper products, aircraft, machinery, albuminoids, starches and glues, and electrical machinery.

Resident diplomatic missions 
 Argentina has an embassy in Wellington.
 New Zealand has an embassy in Buenos Aires.

See also
 List of ambassadors of New Zealand to Argentina

References

 
New Zealand
Bilateral relations of New Zealand